The TP de Oro were a series of Spanish annual television awards awarded between 1972 and 2011 by Teleprograma magazine. In 2012, they were absorbed by Fotogramas de Plata awards.

References

External links
 Web oficial de TP
 IMDb Page

Spanish television awards
Awards established in 1972
Awards disestablished in 2011